The Poor Relief Act 1795 (36 Geo. III c. 10) was an Act of Parliament passed by the Parliament of Great Britain.

The Act enabled guardians of an incorporated district to raise and regulate the poor relief assessments in specified parishes. The assessments would be made according to the price of wheat in Mark Lane, as the previous assessments (the Act claimed) "by reason of the late very great increase of the price of corn, and other necessary articles of life, [are] insufficient for the necessary relief and maintenance of the poor". The Act also stipulated that "the sums to be assessed in any parish shall never exceed in any one year the amount of double the sum at present raised".

Notes

Great Britain Acts of Parliament 1795
1795 in British law
English Poor Laws